The Mumbai Indians are an Indian women's cricket team that compete in the Women's Premier League (WPL), based in Mumbai. The team is owned by Indiawin Sports, who also owns the men's team. The team is coached by Charlotte Edwards, with Jhulan Goswami as their bowling coach and mentor and Devika Palshikar as the batting coach. 

Their squad was assembled at the inaugural WPL player auction in February 2023.

History
In October 2022, the BCCI announced its intentions to hold a five-team women's franchise cricket tournament in March 2023. The tournament was named the Women's Premier League in January 2023, with investors buying the rights to franchises through a closed bidding process during the same month. Indiawin Sports, the owners of Mumbai Indians in the Indian Premier League, bought the rights to one of the franchises.

In February 2023, Charlotte Edwards was announced as head coach of the side. The inaugural player auction for the WPL was held on 13 February 2023, with Mumbai Indians signing 18 players for their squad.

Current squad
As per 2023 season. Players in bold have international caps.

Support Staff

Source: Official website

Kit manufacturers and sponsors

See also
 Mumbai Indians 
 Sports in Maharashtra

References

External links
 

Mumbai Indians
Cricket clubs established in 2023
Women's Premier League (cricket) teams
Cricket in Mumbai
Reliance Sports